Colomé or Colome may refer to:

In people
 Abelardo Colomé Ibarra (born 1939), Vice President of the Council of State of Cuba
 Álex Colomé (born 1988), Dominican professional baseball pitcher 
 Ana María López Colomé, Mexican biochemist
 Antoñita Colomé (1912-2005), Spanish film actress
 Jaime Colomé (born 1979), Cuban retired footballer
 Jesús Colomé (born 1977), former professional relief pitcher
 Jorge Colome (born 1958), Cuban sprint canoer
 Omar Félix Colomé (1932-2015), Argentine Roman Catholic bishop
 Pura López Colomé (born 1952), Mexican poet, translator
 Yoel Colomé (born 1982), Cuban football defender

In places
 Colomé, village and rural municipality in Salta Province in northwestern Argentina
 Colome, South Dakota, city in Tripp County, South Dakota, United States
 Sainte-Colome, commune in the Pyrénées-Atlantiques department in south-western France